Exocarya is a genus of flowering plants belonging to the family Cyperaceae.

Its native range is New Guinea to Northeastern New South Wales.

Species:
 Exocarya sclerioides  F.Muell.) Benth.

References

Cyperaceae
Cyperaceae genera